Gilbert Bettman (October 3, 1881 – July 17, 1942) was an American politician of the Ohio Republican party.

From 1919 to 1929, he was on the faculty, and then the dean of the YMCA Law School of Cincinnati, now the Salmon P. Chase College of Law at Northern Kentucky University.

In 1932, Bettman ran for the office of U.S. senator from Ohio. He lost to the incumbent Democrat, Robert J. Bulkley.

From January 1941 to July 1942, Bettman served as a justice of the Ohio Supreme Court.

See also
List of justices of the Ohio Supreme Court
List of Ohio politicians

References

External links
Finding Aid for Gilbert Bettman papers, Archives and Rare Books Library, University of Cincinnati, Cincinnati, Ohio

1881 births
1942 deaths
Justices of the Ohio Supreme Court
Ohio Attorneys General
Ohio Republicans
Harvard Law School alumni
Burials at Spring Grove Cemetery
Politicians from Cincinnati
American military personnel of World War I
United States Army officers
20th-century American judges